The 1938 Pacific typhoon season featured 31 storms. Data from this period was extremely sparse, so intensity is not available for these systems. The only agency that tracked these typhoons is the International Best Track Archive for Climate Stewardship (IBRrACS), which has compiled a database of all known tropical cyclones since 1851.

Systems

January–May

The first storm of the season formed on January 11, west of the Philippines. It moved northwestward, and made landfall on Luzon late on January 12 before dissipating the next day. It caused no known deaths or damage.

IBTRACS gives a storm of unknown intensity, from April 5 to April 12. It did not affect land.

IBTRACS gives a storm of unknown intensity, from April 29 to May 4. It affected the Philippines, and neared China.

IBTRACS gives a storm of unknown intensity, from May 9 to May 16. It affected the Philippines.

June and July

IBTRACS gives a storm of unknown intensity, from June 21 to July 3. It affected Japan.

IBTRACS gives a storm of unknown intensity, from July 7 to July 10. It affected China.

IBTRACS gives a storm of unknown intensity, from July 15 to July 19. It did not affect land.

Storm Eight

IBTRACS gives a storm of unknown intensity in July. It did not affect land.

Storm Nine

IBTRACS gives a storm of unknown intensity in August. It affected Japan and China.

Storm Ten

IBTRACS gives a storm of unknown intensity in August. It did not affect land.

Storm Eleven

IBTRACS gives a storm of unknown intensity in August. It did not affect land.

Storm Twelve

IBTRACS gives a storm of unknown intensity in August. It affected Taiwan.

Storm Thirteen

IBTRACS gives a storm of unknown intensity in August. It did not affect land.

Storm Fourteen

IBTRACS gives a storm of unknown intensity in August. It affected China.

Storm Fifteen

IBTRACS gives a storm of unknown intensity in August and September. It affected Japan.

Storm Sixteen

IBTRACS gives a storm of unknown intensity in August and September. It affected Japan.

Storm Seventeen

IBTRACS gives a storm of unknown intensity in September. It did not affect land.

Storm Eighteen

IBTRACS gives a storm of unknown intensity in September. It did not affect land.

Storm Nineteen

IBTRACS gives a storm of unknown intensity in September. It neared Japan.

Storm Twenty

IBTRACS gives a storm of unknown intensity in September. It affected Taiwan and China.

Storm Twenty-One

IBTRACS gives a storm of unknown intensity in September. It affected Vietnam.

Storm Twenty-Two

IBTRACS gives a storm of unknown intensity in September and October. It affected the Philippines.

Storm Twenty-Three

IBTRACS gives a storm of unknown intensity in October. It affected the Philippines and China, and caused a shipwreck in Luzon, killing 33 people.

Storm Twenty-Four

IBTRACS gives a storm of unknown intensity in October. It neared Japan.

Storm Twenty-Five

IBTRACS gives a storm of unknown intensity in October. It affected Japan.

Storm Twenty-Six

IBTRACS gives a storm of unknown intensity in October. It did not affect land.

Storm Twenty-Seven

IBTRACS gives a storm of unknown intensity in November. It affected the Philippines and China.

Storm Twenty-Eight

IBTRACS gives a storm of unknown intensity in November. It did not affect land.

Storm Twenty-Nine

IBTRACS gives a storm of unknown intensity in November. It affected the Philippines.

Storm Thirty

IBTRACS gives a storm of unknown intensity in November and December. It affected the Philippines.

Storm Thirty-One

IBTRACS gives a storm of unknown intensity in December. It affected the Philippines, killing 305 people.

See also
 1900–1950 South-West Indian Ocean cyclone seasons
 1900–1940 South Pacific cyclone seasons
 1930s Australian region cyclone seasons

References

Pre-1940 Pacific typhoon seasons
1938 meteorology